Anolis breslini, the northwest Haitian stout anole, is a species of lizard in the family Dactyloidae. The species is found in Haiti.

References

Anoles
Reptiles described in 1980
Reptiles of Haiti
Endemic fauna of Haiti
Taxa named by Albert Schwartz (zoologist)